Bowmantown is an unincorporated community in Washington County, Tennessee.

References

Unincorporated communities in Washington County, Tennessee
Unincorporated communities in Tennessee